Naitō Julia (内藤 ジュリア, 1566 - 28 March 1627) was a Japanese noble lady and religious leader from the Sengoku period to the early Edo period. Julia was one of the prominent Catholic leaders, along with Kyogoku Maria and others women catechist, who strongly resisted the oppressions imposed on Christianity. She faced the rules of samurai governments, staying true to her missionary campaigns even when Christianity was banned in Japan.

Life 
Julia's birth name is not known, her mother was from the Naito clan and her father from the Matsunaga clan. She was born in 1566, as the daughter of Matsunaga Nagayori who was the brother of Matsunaga Hisahide. Her mother was the daughter of Naitô Sadafusa (内藤 定房) of Yagi castle in Tanba province. Her father died when her brother, Naito Joan, was a child and his position as heir to Yagi castle seems to have been unstable. She was married, but her husband died when she was 22. After her husband death, she became a Buddhist nun.

In 1595, she became a Christian and took the name "Julia". (Her brother Joan had been baptized in 1565.) She was a part of the missionary work centered in Kyoto, interacting with the wives and consorts of many Daimyo, converting Gohime (Ukita Hideie's wife and Hideyoshi's daughter) and others to Christianity.

At first, Christians were relatively accepted on Japanese territory, but the situation changed when Toyotomi Hideyoshi reunited Japan. Due to numerous external threats and particularly the expansion of European power in East Asia. This persecution of Christians led Japan to a great conflict, there were many daimyos and powerful lords who were Christians, thus dividing their opinions about Hideyoshi. This war between Catholic missionaries and Buddhist lords led to the Twenty-six Martyrs of Japan incident. Several missionaries were executed, thus taking Naito Julia into a risky position, but she remained faithful to Catholicism and continued her missionary campaigns with a large group of women. 

In 1606, six years after the Battle of Sekigahara, she organized a convent-like group referred to as the "Beatas of Miyako (i.e. Kyoto)" (Miyako no bikuni) - the only such women's group in Japan's Christian Century.

When the Siege of Osaka broke out at the beginning of 1614 at the start of the general persecution of Christianity by the bakufu, Julia and eight other nuns were apprehended, tied up in sacks and carried around the city, then left on the ground for a while. At the end of the year, they were sent out of the country as dangers to the political order, along with most of the Christian clergy, both Japanese and foreign, and her brother Joan and Takayama Ukon and their families. She spent the remainder of her life in Manila, where she and the other Japanese nuns lived a conventual life. She died on March 28, 1627.

References 

1627 deaths
1566 births
Japan–Philippines relations
Japanese Roman Catholics
16th-century Japanese women
16th-century Japanese people
16th-century Roman Catholics
Naitō clan
Converts to Roman Catholicism
Japanese nobility
People of Azuchi–Momoyama-period Japan
People of Muromachi-period Japan
Women of medieval Japan
People of Sengoku-period Japan
Deified Japanese people
Japanese expatriates in the Philippines